Reliquia is a Neotropical genus of butterflies in the family Pieridae.

Species
Reliquia santamarta Ackery, 1975

References

Pierini
Pieridae of South America
Pieridae genera